Good Show, stylized as 9ood Show, is Taiwanese Mandopop artist Show Lo's ninth Mandarin studio album. It was released on 6 April 2012 by Gold Typhoon (Taiwan). The album was available for pre-order from 21 March 2012. The Japanese edition, Count on me/有我在(日本盤) was released on 20 June 2012 by Pony Canyon, which included a DVD with 6 music videos.

Track listing

Music videos & Short Film

Charts

Taiwanese Chart

Japanese Chart
(Japanese Edition)

References

External links
  Show Lo@Gold Typhoon Taiwan
  Show Lo - Bio, News, Images, Album releases (Gold Typhoon)
  羅志祥官方專屬頻道 Show's Official Youtube Channel

2012 albums
Show Lo albums
Gold Typhoon Taiwan albums